Jorge Cabrera is an American politician and union organizer serving as a member of the Connecticut State Senate from the 17th district. Elected in November 2020, he assumed office on January 6, 2021.

Early life and education 
The son of immigrants from Puerto Rico, Cabrera was raised in Connecticut. He earned a Bachelor of Arts degree in political science from Quinnipiac University.

Career 
After serving as a legislative aide for Representative Moira K. Lyons, Cabrera worked as a researcher for the United Brotherhood of Carpenters and Joiners of America. He later joined the United Food and Commercial Workers as an international representative. In 2018, Cabrera ran for the Connecticut State Senate against Republican Senator George Logan and lost by 95 votes.  Cabrera ran again in 2020 and won after another close race.  He assumed office on January 6, 2021.

References 

Living people
Year of birth missing (living people)
Democratic Party Connecticut state senators
Quinnipiac University alumni
21st-century American politicians